Mary Loretta Hartley (born June 21, 1940) is an American film and television actress. She is best known for work with Bill Bixby on The Incredible  Hulk (1978) and Goodnight, Beantown (1983–1984), All Our Yesterdays an original Star Trek episode (1969), Sam Peckinpah's Ride the High Country (1962) with Randolph Scott and Joel McCrea, and a series of commercials with James Garner in the 1970s and 1980s.

Early life
Hartley was born in Weston, Connecticut on June 21, 1940, the daughter of Mary "Polly" Ickes (née Watson), a manager and saleswoman, and Paul Hembree Hartley, an account executive. Her maternal grandfather was John B. Watson, an American psychologist who established the psychological school of behaviorism. She grew up in Weston, Connecticut, an affluent Fairfield County suburb within commuting distance to Manhattan.

She graduated from the Carnegie Institute of Technology in Pittsburgh, Pennsylvania, in 1965.

Career

Early appearances

Hartley began her career as a 13-year-old in the White Barn Theatre in Norwalk, Connecticut. In her teens as a stage actress, she was coached and mentored by Eva Le Gallienne. She graduated in 1957 from Staples High School in Westport, Connecticut, where she was an active member of the school's theater group, Staples Players. Hartley also worked at the American Shakespeare Festival.

Her film career began with an uncredited cameo appearance in From Hell to Texas (1958), a Western with Dennis Hopper. In the early 1960s, she moved to Los Angeles and joined the UCLA Theater Group.

Hartley's first credited film appearance was alongside Randolph Scott and Joel McCrea in the 1962 Sam Peckinpah Western Ride the High Country; the role earned her a BAFTA award nomination. She continued to appear in film during the 1960s, including the lead role in the adventure Drums of Africa (1963), and prominent supporting roles in Alfred Hitchcock's psychological thriller Marnie (1964) — alongside Tippi Hedren and Sean Connery — and the John Sturges drama Marooned (1969).

Hartley also guest-starred in numerous TV series during the decade, with appearances in Gunsmoke, The Twilight Zone (the episode "The Long Morrow"), The Travels of Jaimie McPheeters, Death Valley Days, Judd, for the Defense, Bonanza,  and Star Trek (as Zarabeth in the 3rd-season episode "All Our Yesterdays", 1969)  among others. In 1965, she had a significant role as Dr. Claire Morton in 32 episodes of Peyton Place.

1970s and 1980s

Hartley continued to perform in film and TV during the 1970s, including two Westerns alongside Lee Van Cleef, Barquero (1970) and The Magnificent Seven Ride! (1972), and TV series including  The Love Boat, The Streets of San Francisco, Emergency!, McCloud, Little House on the Prairie, Love American Style, Police Woman, and Columbo — starring in two editions of the latter alongside Peter Falk; Publish or Perish co-starring Jack Cassidy (1974) and Try and Catch Me with Ruth Gordon (1977). Hartley portrays similar characters as a publisher's assistant in both episodes.

In 1977, Hartley appeared in the TV movie The Last Hurrah, a political drama based on the Edwin O'Connor novel of the same name; and earned her first Emmy Award nomination.

Her role as psychologist Dr. Carolyn Fields in "Married", a 1978 episode of the TV series The Incredible Hulk in which she marries Bill Bixby's character, the alter ego of the Hulk, won Hartley the Primetime Emmy Award for Outstanding Lead Actress in a Drama Series. She was nominated for the same award for her performance in an episode of The Rockford Files the following year.

In 1983, Hartley reunited with Bixby in the sitcom Goodnight, Beantown, which ran for two seasons and brought her another Emmy Award nomination. (She worked with Bixby again in the 1992 TV movie A Diagnosis of Murder, the first of three TV movies that launched the series Diagnosis: Murder).

In 1987, she co-hosted CBS's The Morning Program weekday morning news show alongside Rolland Smith, for ten months.

Later career
In the 1990s, Hartley toured with Elliott Gould and Doug Wert in the revival of the mystery play Deathtrap.
Numerous roles in TV movies and guest appearances in TV series during the 1990s and 2000s followed, including Murder, She Wrote (1992), Courthouse (1995), Nash Bridges (2000), and NCIS (2005). She had recurring roles as Sister Mary Daniel in the soap opera One Life to Live (1999–2001; 10 episodes), and as Lorna Scarry in six episodes of Law & Order: Special Victims Unit (2003–2011).

From 1995 to 2015, she hosted the long-running television documentary series Wild About Animals, an educational program.

In 2006, Hartley starred in her own one-woman show, If You Get to Bethlehem, You've Gone Too Far, which ran in Los Angeles. She returned to the stage in 2014 as Eleanor of Aquitaine with Ian Buchanan's Henry in the Colony Theater Company production of James Goldman's The Lion in Winter.

In January 2018, Hartley began a recurring role on the Fox first-responder drama 9-1-1 as Patricia Clark, the Alzheimer's-afflicted mother of dispatcher Abby Clark (Connie Britton).

Advertising

In the late 1970s and early 1980s, Hartley appeared with James Garner in a popular series of television commercials advertising Polaroid cameras. The two actors had such natural on-screen chemistry that many viewers erroneously believed that they were married in real life. Hartley's 1990 biography, Breaking the Silence, indicates that she began to wear a T-shirt printed with the phrase "I am not Mrs. James Garner." (Hartley went as far to have a shirt made for her infant son, reading "I am not James Garner's Child" and even one for her then-husband: "I am not James Garner!" James Garner's actual wife then jokingly had a T-shirt printed with "I am Mrs. James Garner.") Hartley guest-starred in an episode of Garner's television series The Rockford Files in 1979. The script required the two to kiss at one point and unbeknownst to them, a paparazzo was photographing the scene from a distance. The photos were run in a tabloid trying to provoke a scandal. An article that ran in TV Guide was titled: "That woman is not James Garner's wife!"

Between 2001 and 2006, Hartley endorsed the See Clearly Method, a commercial eye exercise program, whose sales were halted by an Iowa court after a finding of fraudulent business practices and advertising.

Honors
She received an honorary degree from Rider College in 1993.

Personal life
Hartley has been married three times. Her first marriage was to John Seventa (1960–1962). She married Patrick Boyriven on August 13, 1978, with whom she had two children, Sean (born 1975) and Justine (born 1978). The couple divorced in 1996. In 2005, Hartley married Jerry Sroka.

In her 1990 autobiography Breaking the Silence, written with Anne Commire, Hartley talked about her struggles with psychological problems, pointing directly to her grandfather's (Dr. Watson) practical application of his theories as the source of the dysfunction in his family. She has also spoken in public about her experience with bipolar disorder and was a founder of the American Foundation for Suicide Prevention. She currently serves as the foundation's national spokesperson.

In 2003, Hartley was hired by pharmaceutical company GlaxoSmithKline to increase awareness of bipolar medications and treatments. She frequently promotes awareness of bipolar disorder and suicide prevention.

Her brother, Paul Hartley, has a PhD in research philosophy and is the author of the book The Seventh Tool: a novel in 3 volumes (2013).

In 2009, Hartley spoke at a suicide and violence prevention forum about her father's suicide.

Filmography

Films

Television

References

Further reading

External links

 
 
 
 "Mariette Hartley's autobiography and John B. Watson" — article about the children of psychologists Watson and B. F. Skinner

20th-century American actresses
21st-century American actresses
Living people
Actresses from Connecticut
Actresses from Los Angeles
American film actresses
American television actresses
Outstanding Performance by a Lead Actress in a Drama Series Primetime Emmy Award winners
People from Westport, Connecticut
People with bipolar disorder
Staples High School alumni
1940 births